Robin Mathews (born 1931) is a Canadian poet, professor, and political activist against United States foreign policy.

Education
Born in Smithers, British Columbia, Mathews took his Bachelor of Arts in English at the University of British Columbia (UBC), having such professors as Earle Birney. He did an undergraduate honours thesis at UBC on Matthew Arnold and completed his MA at Ohio State University with a thesis on Henry James. After working for a year as a radio producer for the Canadian Broadcasting Corporation, Mathews began a PhD at the University of Toronto where he was an unconvinced student of the mythopoeic theorist and critic Northrop Frye.

Career
Mathews published his first collection of poems in 1961. In the same decade he came to national attention by strongly criticizing United States foreign policy and the complementary colonial attitude of Canadian elites.  He also spearheaded the movement to have Canadian literature taught in schools.
 
He has taught at the University of Alberta in Edmonton, Alberta, Carleton University in Ottawa, Ontario, and Simon Fraser University in Burnaby, British Columbia.

He was involved in literary circles in Toronto, Ontario during his years at the University of Toronto while he was doing his doctoral studies. At Toronto he studied under Northrop Frye and was acquainted with both Margaret Atwood and Canadian poet Milton Acorn.

Works
He has taught, lectured and written numerous volumes of both poetry and prose. His works include the Struggle for Canadian Universities, Treason of the Intellectuals, The Death of Socialism, and Being Canadian in Dirty Imperialist Times. He also published Canadian Identity, an overview of how Canadian identity is constructed by Liberals, Leftists, Conservatives, religion, economics, and socially, published in 1988.

Politics

Mathews was leader of the left wing National Party of Canada from 1979 to 1980s. Mathews ran for office in 1979 as an independent in Ottawa Centre and under the party banner in 1979.

He was involved with the New Democratic Party of Canada prior to 1979.

References

External links
Mathews in the Literary Encyclopedia
Mathews' column on ViveleCanada
Records of the Esther and Robin Mathews May 1968 Paris Poster Collection are held by Simon Fraser University's Special Collections and Rare Books
Robin Mathews fonds (R4403) at Library and Archives Canada

1931 births
20th-century Canadian poets
Canadian male poets
Living people
People from Smithers, British Columbia
Writers from British Columbia
University of British Columbia alumni
20th-century Canadian male writers